Argyrochosma peninsularis is a fern endemic to Baja California Sur. It grows in dry, rocky places. First described as a species in 1939, it was transferred to the new genus Argyrochosma (the "false cloak ferns") in 1987, recognizing their distinctness from the "cloak ferns" (Notholaena sensu stricto). A dusting of powdery material and the presence of occasional scales on the central axis of its leaves help distinguish it from related species.

Description
Argyrochosma peninsularis is a medium-sized epipetric fern. The rhizome is short and compact, and may be horizontal or upright. They are of a uniform color, pale to chestnut brown or orange-brown. The stipe is a glossy dark purple or dark chestnut brown in color, rounded, and bears scales near the base, similar to those of the rhizome but reduced in size.

The leaf blades are deltate (triangular) to oblong-lanceolate, ovate-lanceolate or ovate. They are bipinnate-pinnatifid (divided into pinnae and deeply lobed pinnules). Each blade has 7 to 12 pairs of pinnae, which are widely spaced, lanceolate to narrowly oblong in shape, with a short stalk at the base, or none at all, connecting them to the rachis. The lowest pair of pinnae is slightly shorter than those above. The ultimate segments are oblong to ovate or nearly deltate, and the dark color of their stalks usually passes into the leaf, rather than halting at a joint at the segment base. Hairs are not present on the leaf blade. The upper surface bears scattered glands and farina while the lower surface is densely covered in white farina.

The sori occur along the veins, starting from halfway to two-thirds of the way out from axis to edge. The edges of the leaf segments do not curl or fold to protect them. Each sporangium contains 64 spores. The spores are nearly smooth, unlike many members of the genus.

The lack of joints at the leaf segment bases, very dark leaf and segment axes, and the presence of scales and farina on the rachis help distinguish it from other species in the genus, particularly A. incana.

Taxonomy
It was first described by William Ralph Maxon and Charles Alfred Weatherby in 1939 as Notholaena peninsularis, based on material collected in Baja California. The epithet presumably refers to its range being limited to the Baja California Peninsula. They placed it within a group of ferns closely related to Notholaena nivea. Both Edwin Copeland and Weatherby suggested in the 1940s that this group of ferns might represent a distinct genus of its own. This was finally addressed in 1987 by Michael D. Windham, who was carrying out phylogenetic studies of these genera. He elevated Notholaena sect. Argyrochosma to become the genus Argyrochosma, and transferred this species to that genus as A. peninsularis. In 2018, Maarten J. M. Christenhusz transferred the species to Hemionitis as H. cairon (the epithet peninsularis was preoccupied), as part of a program to consolidate the cheilanthoid ferns into that genus. The epithet refers to the centaur Cairon in the novel The Neverending Story.

It lies within a subclade of the genus that also contains A. delicatula, A. incana, A. pallens, A. palmeri, and A. pilifera. All members of the clade share pale farina principally composed of terpenoid compounds, unlike the dihydrostilbenoids found in the farina of other members of the genus.

Distribution and habitat
Argyrochosma delicatula is only known from the state of Baja California Sur, in Mexico.

Notes and references

References

Works cited

External links
Isotype of the species at JSTOR Plant Science.

peninsularis
Plants described in 1939
Ferns of Mexico
Flora of Baja California Sur